Mohandas Karamchand Gandhi, popularly known as Mahatma Gandhi, informally The Father of the Nation in India, undertook 18 fasts during India's freedom movement. His longest fasts lasted 21 days. Fasting was a weapon used by Gandhi as part of his philosophy of Ahimsa (non-violence) as well as satyagraha.

Fasts

References

External links
 List of fasts done by Mahatma Gandhi

Mahatma Gandhi
Protests in British India
Protests in India
Gandhi